Préaux may refer to the following places in France:

 Préaux, Ardèche, a commune in the department of Ardèche
 Préaux, Indre, a commune in the department of Indre
 Préaux, Mayenne, a commune in the department of Mayenne
 Préaux, Seine-Maritime, a commune in the department of Seine-Maritime
 Préaux-Bocage, a commune in the department of Calvados
 Préaux-du-Perche, a commune in the department of Orne
 Préaux-Saint-Sébastien, a commune in the department of Calvados
 Les Préaux, a commune in the department of Eure